William "Spaceman" Patterson is a guitarist and producer, who has collaborated with Miles Davis, James Brown and Frank Ocean.

History 

Spaceman Patterson was one of the musicians in Miles Davis' touring line-up in the 1980s. In 1992, Patterson provided music for Ntozake Shange's The Love Space Demands, an adaptation of some of her poetry. In 1995, Patterson produced Melvin Van Peebles' 1995 album Ghetto Gothic. In 2003, he was musical director for the play Dream on Monkey Mountain presented at the Harlem School of the Arts.

In 2008, Patterson was enlisted to produce a hip hop album for Bill Cosby. Known at that time for his comedic work and not for performing hip hop, Cosby's album came as a surprise to some. Patterson told the Associated Press that when Cosby contacted him about making the album, "people started speculating, is he going to rap about Jell-O Pudding Pops or what?" The resulting release, titled The Cosnarati: State Of Emergency, came out on November 14, 2009 on World Alert Music.

In 2016, Spaceman Patterson played guitar on multiple Frank Ocean recordings, including the albums Endless and Blonde. As of 2018, at least 20 hours of outtakes from Patterson's Frank Ocean sessions have not been released.

Discography 
Per each album's liner notes.

Studio albums

With Jamaica Boys 
 1987: Jamaica Boys (Warner Bros)
 1989: J Boys (Warner Bros)
 1990: Shake It Up (Warner Bros)

With J-Funk Express 
 1993: Getting Back To My Roots (Pioneer)
 1995: This is Rare Groove (99 Records)

As producer 
 1983: Trademark – Uh-huh! (Move'n Groove Records)
 1995: Melvin Van Peebles – Ghetto Gothic (Capitol Records)
1996: Monifah – Moods... Moments (Universal)
 2009: Bill Cosby – The Cosnarati State of Emergency (World Alert Music)

As sideman

With James Blood Ulmer 
 1980: Are You Glad to Be in America? (Rough Trade)
 1993: Blues Preacher (Columbia)

With Miles Davis 
 1989: Amandla (Warner Bros)
 2001: 1986-1991: The Warner Years (Warner Bros)

With David Sanborn 
 1992: Upfront (Elektra)
 1994: Hearsay (Elektra)

With Frank Ocean 
 2016: Endless (Def Jam)
 2016: Blonde (Boys Don't Cry)

With others

 1976: Hamiet Bluiett - Wildflowers: The New York Loft Jazz Sessions
1989: Sly and Robbie – Silent Assassin (Island Records)
1990: Toshinobu Kubota – Bonga Wanga (CBS)
 1993: Teddy Pendergrass – A Little More Magic (Elektra)
1997: Ultramagnetic MCs – The B-Sides Companion (Next Plateau)
 2010: Jaheim – Another Round (Atlantic)

References

External links

American male composers
21st-century American composers
Living people
1954 births
21st-century American male musicians
Jamaica Boys members